Ijamsville may refer to:
 Ijamsville, Indiana, an unincorporated town in Pleasant Township, Wabash County, Indiana, United States
 Ijamsville, Maryland, an unincorporated area in Frederick County, Maryland, United States